Batu Pahat is a federal constituency in Batu Pahat District, Johor, Malaysia, that has been represented in the Dewan Rakyat since 1955.

The federal constituency was created in the 1955 redistribution and is mandated to return a single member to the Dewan Rakyat under the first past the post voting system.

Demographics

History

Polling districts
According to the gazette issued on 31 October 2022, the Batu Pahat constituency has a total of 44 polling districts.

Representation history

State conatituency

Current state assembly members

Local governments

Election results

References

Johor federal constituencies
Constituencies established in 1955